Brickey is a surname. Notable people with the surname include:

Frank Brickey (1912–1994), American football and basketball coach
Robert Brickey (born 1967), American basketball coach
Brickey Farmer (1885–1969), Australian rugby union player

English-language surnames